Double Divas  is an American reality television series on Lifetime that premiered on January 10, 2013. It chronicles the day-to-day operations at LiviRae Lingerie, a custom lingerie store located in Kennesaw, Georgia. Best friend duo Molly Hopkins and Cynthia Richards are the owners with Loren Schaffer as their apprentice. The second season premiered on August 6, 2013.

The series premiered in Australia on the Style Network on April 6, 2015.

Episodes

Season 1 (2013)

Season 2 (2013)

References

External links

2010s American reality television series
2013 American television series debuts
2013 American television series endings
English-language television shows
Lifetime (TV network) original programming
Television shows set in Georgia (U.S. state)